Veblen may refer to:

 Thorstein Veblen (1857–1929), American economist and sociologist
 Thomas T. Veblen, American forester
 Veblen good, named after Thorstein Veblen
 Oswald Veblen (1880–1960), American mathematician (Thorstein Veblen's nephew)
 Veblen, South Dakota, city in Marshall County, South Dakota, United States
 31665 Veblen, main-belt asteroid